Ain-Bessem is a town and commune in Bouïra Province, Algeria. According to the 2008 census it has a population of 32,548.

Ain Bessam people are the same ethnic group of Berbers of Kabylia. But only few of them speaks Kabyle, Ain bessam people also known as "Souara" are Berbers who speaks Algerian Arabic (Derja')

References

Communes of Bouïra Province